Microsat-R was claimed to be an experimental imaging satellite manufactured by DRDO and launched by Indian Space Research Organisation on 24 January 2019 for military use. Satellite served as a target for ASAT test on 27 March 2019.

Launch 
Microsat-R, along with KalamsatV2 as piggy-back, was launched on 24 January 2019 at 23:37 hrs from First Launch Pad of Satish Dhawan Space Centre. The launch marks the 46th flight of PSLV. After 13 minutes 26 seconds in flight, Microsat-R was injected at targeted altitude of about 277.2 km. This was the first flight of a new variant of PSLV called PSLV-DL with two strap-ons, each carrying 12.2-tonne of solid propellant.

Anti-satellite test 
Microsat-R served as target for Indian ASAT experiment on March 27, 2019. The impact generated more than 400 pieces of orbital debris with 24 having apogee higher than ISS orbit. According to initial assessment by DRDO some of the debris (depending on size and trajectory) should re-enter in 45 days. A spokesperson from NASA disagreed, saying the debris could last for years because the solar minimum had contracted the atmosphere that would otherwise cause the debris to reenter. Analysis from a leading space trajectory and environment simulation company AGI has also came to same conclusion that few debris fragments will take more than a year to come down and other debris fragments might pose a risk to other satellites and ISS and these results were also presented in the 35th Space Symposium at Colorado Springs.

As of March 2022, only one catalogued piece of debris from Microsat-R remains in orbit: COSPAR 2019-006DE, SATCAT 44383. This final piece decayed from orbit 14 June 2022.

See also
Microsat (ISRO)
Kosmos 149
Kosmos 320
SLATS

References

External links 
 

Earth observation satellites of India
Spacecraft launched by India in 2019
Spacecraft launched by PSLV rockets
January 2019 events in India
Intentionally destroyed artificial satellites
Military equipment introduced in the 2010s
Satellite collisions